Garea is a surname. Notable people with the surname include:

John Garea (born 1949), New Zealand professional wrestler
Tony Garea (born 1946), New Zealand professional wrestler, brother of John

See also
Barea (surname)